The Kiowa are a nation of Native Americans.

Kiowa may also refer to:

Places

United States
 Kiowa, Colorado
 Kiowa, Kansas
 Kiowa, Nebraska, a ghost town
 Kiowa, Oklahoma
 Fort Kiowa, South Dakota

Other uses
 Bell OH-58 Kiowa, a family of single-engine, single-rotor, observation and light attack helicopters
 Kiowa language, a Kiowa-Tanoan language
 Kiowa Shale, a geological unit in Kansas and neighboring states

See also
 Kiowa County (disambiguation)
 Kiowa National Grassland, New Mexico, US
 Lake Kiowa, Texas, a census-designated place
 American Indians of Iowa
 Kiawah people, South Carolina, US